Helladia is a genus of beetles in the subfamily Lamiinae.

Species 

 Helladia adelpha
 Helladia ferrugata
 Helladia flavescens
 Helladia humeralis
 Helladia imperialis
 Helladia millefolii
 Helladia praetextata

References

Lamiinae
Beetles described in 1864
Beetles of Asia